Caselle in Pittari is a town and comune in the province of Salerno in the Campania region of south-western Italy.

References

External links

Official website

Cities and towns in Campania
Localities of Cilento